Timmapur is a village in the Sindhanur taluk of Raichur district in the Indian state of Karnataka. Temple of Ayyappa swami is located in Timmapur. Timmapur lies on Jawalagera-Olaballari road.

Demographics
 India census, Timmapur had a population of 2,342 with 1,130 males and 1,212 females and 485 Households.

See also
Yaddaladoddi
Alabanoor
Amba Matha
Olaballari
Sindhanur
Raichur

References

External links
 http://raichur.nic.in

Villages in Raichur district